Mohegan State Forest is a Connecticut state forest located in the towns of Scotland and Sprague. The forest is available for hiking, hunting, and letterboxing.

References

External links
Mohegan State Forest Connecticut Department of Energy and Environmental Protection

State parks of Connecticut
Parks in New London County, Connecticut
Scotland, Connecticut
Protected areas established in 1960
1960 establishments in Connecticut